Club 328 was a British air charter operator based at Southampton Airport. It operated business jets and charters.

In October 2007, Club 328 was purchased by South of France-based operator/broker PlaneChartering.

Club 328 Limited held a United Kingdom Civil Aviation Authority Type B Operating Licence; it was permitted to carry passengers, cargo and mail on aircraft with fewer than 20 seats and/or weighing less than 10 tonnes. Club 328 Limited was a subsidiary of Corporate Jet Services Limited.

History 

Originally established in 2002 as Calljet, the airline subsequently operated under the names Ourjet and Bookajet. It was rebranded as Club 328 in 2004, and owned a Geneva, Switzerland-based subsidiary, Club Airways International.

Club 328 signed a deal with security provider, Veritas International Consultants, to provide chaperones for some of its high-profile customers.

Re-branded as PlaneChartering in October 2007, the Club 328 name ceased to exist in 2008. PlaneChartering went bankrupt in June 2008, with its Air Operator Certificate being revoked by the UK CAA.

Fleet 

The Club 328 fleet consisted of the following aircraft (at March 2008) :

 BAe 125-800B
 Cessna Citation II

See also
 List of defunct airlines of the United Kingdom

References

Defunct airlines of the United Kingdom
Airlines established in 2004
Airlines disestablished in 2008